The Ilva is a left tributary of the river Someșul Mare in Romania. Its source is near the village Piatra Fântânele and the Tihuța Pass. It flows through the villages Lunca Ilvei, Ilva Mare, Măgura Ilvei and Poiana Ilvei. It discharges into the Someșul Mare in Ilva Mică.

References

Rivers of Romania
Rivers of Bistrița-Năsăud County